US Airways Shuttle was the brand name for US Airways' hourly air shuttle service operating in the Northeastern United States. It served Logan International Airport in Boston, LaGuardia Airport in New York City, and Ronald Reagan Washington National Airport in Washington, D.C.

The shuttle had various food and beverage offerings that included:
 Breakfast snack served on morning flights before 9 a.m. on business days
 Complimentary soft drinks, juices, coffee and tea
 Complimentary beer and wine after 10 a.m.

First class service was available on all Shuttle flights.  Complimentary spirits were offered in addition to the economy offerings.

On October 17, 2015, the shuttle service became known as American Airlines Shuttle.

History

The US Airways Shuttle was the descendant of the Eastern Air Lines Shuttle, which established service on the route in 1961. Real estate mogul and future US President Donald Trump purchased the shuttle from Eastern Airlines in 1989, during a time when Eastern was being dismantled by Texas Air. The service was briefly operated as the Trump Shuttle from June 7, 1989, until the company defaulted on loans in September 1990. After the Trump venture failed, ownership passed to a syndicate of 22 lenders to the venture, led by Citigroup.

Unable to sell the operation outright to Northwest Airlines, American Airlines, or USAir Group, the banks negotiated a complex marketing arrangement in which USAir Group would assume 40% ownership of Shuttle, Inc. and would manage the operation for ten years, including selling tickets, keeping financial records, advertising and marketing, aircraft maintenance, and labor relations. On April 7, 1992, Trump Shuttle ceased to exist when it was merged into a new corporation, Shuttle, Inc., which began operating as the USAir Shuttle on April 12.

The Shuttle, Inc. agreement gave USAir an option to purchase the entire shuttle operation on or after October 10, 1996, with an exclusive right to do so until April 10, 1997. USAir Group subsequently announced its intent to exercise its right to purchase the remaining 60% of Shuttle, Inc. on November 19, 1997, but "continued to operate the US Airways Shuttle separately from the rest of the airline. Employees of the Shuttle also operated on a separate seniority list, since the company operated as a wholly-owned subsidiary of US Airways Group".

Shuttle Inc. remained as a subsidiary of US Airways Group until July 1, 2000, when "the US Airways Shuttle merged into the mainline operation of US Airways." US Airways Group, as the USAir Group is now known due to the merger with America West Airlines, repainted their aircraft to remove the "Shuttle" part from the name. As an "airline with an airline," and a subsidiary and operating division of the USAir Group, the US Airways Shuttle no longer exists.

However, the Northeast service of frequent shuttle flights and strategic marketing by way of the New "merged" US Airways under the US Airways Group, did continue to operate without being considered a separate division or subsidiary airline.  During this time, US Airways Shuttle briefly expanded service to Dulles International Airport, near Washington DC, in addition to service to Washington's Reagan Airport.  This service ended soon after the terrorist attacks of September 11, 2001.

All planes on the shuttle routes had a single-class configuration until 2004 when first-class seats were added.

Fleet

Passenger
The US Airways Shuttle was operated by American Airlines utilizing its Airbus A319 and Embraer 190 aircraft.

Retired
Airbus A320-200
Boeing 727-200
Boeing 737-300
McDonnell Douglas DC-9-30

See also 
 List of defunct airlines of the United States

References

Airlines established in 1992
Airlines disestablished in 2015
US Airways Group
Defunct airlines of the United States
Former Star Alliance affiliate members